Zhihe Subdistrict  is a subdistrict situated in Pengzhou, Sichuan, China. , it administers the following 15 residential neighborhoods and seven villages:
Shuanglong Community
Taiping Community
Beijingtang Community
Wanjia Community
Changqing Community
Dongyuan Community
Shunhe Community
Huitonghu Community
Huxian Community
Puzhao Community
Qinglin Community
Lianfeng Community
Qingyang Community
Baixiang Community
Xingren Community
Mingtai Village
Huatu Village
Guyun Village
Hexing Village
Longpan Village
Gaoqiao Village
Heyuan Village

See also
List of township-level divisions of Sichuan

References

Township-level divisions of Sichuan
Pengzhou